Ponto de Encontro (Meeting Point) was a Portuguese television series that reunited people with long-lost families and friends. It was produced in the 1990s for SIC TV channel.

1990s Portuguese television series